"These Days" is the first single by Alien Ant Farm from the band's third album, Truant. "These Days" was released to radio on July 1, 2003.

Music video
The music video for "These Days" was filmed and performed on the rooftop of the Hollywood Masonic Temple, across the street from the Kodak Theatre, in Los Angeles. The surprise performance was shot during the 2003 BET Awards while numerous hip hop artists and rappers were arriving on the red carpet before the awards show. The video catches the reaction from many artists, including Pharrell, Nelly, Snoop Dogg, Killer Mike, and Lil' Kim among others. The band was arrested at the site and later dismissed by local authorities. The director of the video is Marc Klasfeld.

Another video was shot where the band made surprise performances outside of Staples Center before a performance of the Justified and Stripped Tour - co-headlined by Justin Timberlake and Christina Aguilera - and crashed the West Hollywood Gay Pride Parade in their own ant-themed float, as well as using clips from their BET Awards guerilla performance.

Charts

References

External links

2003 singles
Alien Ant Farm songs
DreamWorks Records singles
2003 songs